Golyazh is a rural locality (a village) in Kolchugino, Kolchuginsky District, Vladimir Oblast, Russia. The population was 55 as of 2010.

Geography 
Golyazh is located on the Peksha River, 9 km north of Kolchugino (the district's administrative centre) by road. Litvinovo is the nearest rural locality.

References 

Rural localities in Kolchuginsky District